Rúben Filipe Marques Amorim (born 27 January 1985) is a Portuguese professional football manager and former player who is the current manager of Primeira Liga club Sporting CP.

Amorim played in his career as a midfielder, spending most of his professional career with Belenenses and Benfica, signing with the latter in 2008 and going on to win ten major titles, including three league titles, one Taça de Portugal, five Taças da Liga and one Supertaça Cândido de Oliveira. He represented Portugal in two FIFA World Cups, earning a total of 14 caps.

Upon retiring in 2017, he began his coaching career at Casa Pia in 2018, before resigning in 2018, amid a dispute with the Portuguese Football Federation (FPF). He was appointed as head coach at Braga B, before taking charge of the first team in December 2019, winning the 2020 Taça da Liga.

In March 2020, Amorim was appointed manager of Sporting CP for a managerial transfer worth €10 million (£8.65 million), becoming the fourth-most expensive manager ever. He guided the club to a double of the Taça da Liga and the Primeira Liga, ending the latter's 19-year league title drought. These achievements won him the Primeira Liga's Manager of the Year award in 2021.

Club career

Belenenses
Born in Lisbon, Amorim made his debut in the Primeira Liga on 14 December 2003, playing one minute for hometown club Belenenses in a 2–0 home win against Alverca. From 2005–06 onwards, he became a regular.

In the 2007–08 campaign, Amorim started in 28 of his 29 league appearances (2,491 minutes of action) and helped his team finish in eighth position.

Benfica
In late April 2008, Amorim signed a four-year deal with Benfica after his Belenenses contract expired. During his first season he was a regular starter, scoring his first goal on 23 November in a 2–0 away victory over Académica de Coimbra.

Competing with new signings Javi García and Ramires, Amorim appeared less in 2009–10, but still featured prominently (24 matches with ten starts) as the side won the league – and the League Cup – after a five-year drought. When healthy, he was again regularly used by manager Jorge Jesus in the 2010–11 season. On 19 January 2011, however, after undergoing surgery on both knees, he was sidelined for several months.

In early October 2011, whilst on duty with the national team, Amorim criticised Jesus' preferences – Benfica played most of their games without a single Portuguese player. Increasingly disgusted with his plight, in December, he refused to train with the bench players – after warming up for several minutes only to not be used – following a game against Rio Ave, being subjected to the club's disciplinary proceedings; on 30 January 2012, a loan was arranged with Braga until June of the following year.

In 2013–14, Amorim returned to the Estádio da Luz and played 37 matches across all competitions, helping to win an unprecedent treble of league, Taça de Portugal and Taça da Liga. At the beginning of the following campaign, he featured the full 120 minutes to help his team defeat Rio Ave in the Supertaça Cândido de Oliveira, thus winning four titles in 2014. On 24 August, however, he got severely injured while playing on an artificial turf at Boavista, with news the next day reporting an anterior cruciate ligament injury; he was sidelined until 11 February 2015, when he featured as a substitute in a 3–0 home defeat of Vitória de Setúbal in the semi-finals of the domestic league cup.

On 14 August 2015, Amorim joined Al-Wakrah in Qatar on a season-long deal. On 4 April 2017, after more than a year of inactivity, the 32-year-old terminated his contract with Benfica and retired.

International career

Amorim appeared for Portugal at the 2007 UEFA European Under-21 Championship in the Netherlands, as the national side eventually lost to Italy for the final berth for the following year's Summer Olympic Games. On 10 May 2010, although not part of the senior squad's list of 23 for the 2010 FIFA World Cup, he was named in a backup list of six players. On 8 June, he replaced Nani after the Manchester United player sustained a clavicle injury which ruled him out of the finals in South Africa. His senior debut came on the 15th, as he played the last five minutes of the group stage opener against Ivory Coast (0–0) in the place of Raul Meireles.

Amorim was also selected by new manager Paulo Bento for the 2014 World Cup. He made his debut in the tournament on 26 June in the last group phase match against Ghana, featuring the full 90 minutes in the 2–1 win but seeing his team eliminated on goal difference.

Style of play
Amorim's style was similar to countryman Tiago, with both playing the same position, operating in central midfield, both defensive and offensive (Amorim, however, was also able to play as a right back).

Coaching career

Early career
Shortly after retiring, Amorim joined the Lisbon Football Association in order to earn a coaching licence. Additionally, he attended a postgraduation course in psychomotor education.

Amorim started working as a manager in 2018–19, with third division team Casa Pia. In January 2019, the team were deducted six points and he was suspended from all activity for one year after giving instructions during a match without having the required coaching level to do so; even though the bans were suspended shortly after, he presented his resignation in the aftermath.

On 20 May 2019, Amorim initially agreed to return to Benfica as their under-23 coach. The following month, however, after a meeting at the club, he rejected that possibility.

Braga
In mid-September 2019, Amorim was appointed at Braga's reserves in the third tier. Three months later, he replaced the dismissed Ricardo Sá Pinto at the helm of the first team on a two-and-a-half-year contract, with the Minhotos being eighth place in the league at the time of his appointment. In his first game in charge on 4 January, he led them to a 7–1 away demolition of Belenenses SAD, and three weeks later won the domestic league cup final against Porto with a last-minute goal from Ricardo Horta. In the Primeira Liga, on 15 February, Amorim recorded Braga's first win away to Benfica in 65 years, with João Palhinha scoring the game's only goal. He lost his first point in the league, after Braga drew 2–2 at home to Gil Vicente. Amorim only lost two games for the club, in the round of sixteen of the 2019–20 UEFA Europa League against Rangers, 3–2 away in the first leg and 1–0 on the return leg at home.

Sporting CP

2019–20: Debut season 
Amorim became Sporting CP's manager on 4 March 2020 after the sacking of Silas, signing a deal until 30 June 2023 with a €20 million buyout clause. Despite only having two months of top-flight experience, Sporting paid €10 million for his services, the third-highest transfer fee for a manager in history. In his first game in charge on 8 March, he led them to a 2–0 home win against Desportivo das Aves. In the rest of the games he took over, Amorim won six and drew three, but lost to Benfica in the Derby de Lisboa and rivals Porto at the end of the season, guiding Sporting to a fourth-place finish and qualification to the Europa League third qualifying round. Despite their finish, Amorim managed to bring an recognisable identity that the club had previously been lacking.

2020–21: Sporting's first league title in 19 years 
In the summer transfer window, Jérémy Mathieu retired after suffering a knee injury in training, and was replaced by Zouhair Feddal. Rodrigo Battaglia, Miguel Luís, Luciano Vietto, Wendel, and Marcos Acuña departed from the club. Experienced goalkeeper Antonio Adán was brought in as the new first-choice goalkeeper, with other signings including Nuno Santos, Bruno Tabata, Pedro Porro,  João Mário  and João Palhinha, the last returning from his loan at Braga. At the end of the transfer window, Sporting signed Pedro Gonçalves, who had impressed in the previous season at Famalicão. Along with the new signings, Amorim promoted Daniel Bragança, Gonçalo Inácio, Matheus Nunes, Nuno Mendes and Tiago Tomás to the first-team squad.

On 23 January 2021, Amorim won his second consecutive league cup final, against his previous club; both he and Braga manager Carlos Carvalhal were sent to the stands for arguing with each other. On 4 March, he renewed his contract for one more year, with an improved release clause of €30 million. Following a national record of a 32-match unbeaten-streak, including on 11 May, a 1–0 home win against Boavista, he guided the club to their first league title triumph in 19 years, with Pedro Gonçalves finishing as the top scorer of the league with 23 goals and six Sporting players being named in the Primeira Liga Team of the Year. Sporting only had one loss, during the season, being defeated by rivals Benfica 4–3 away in the Derby de Lisboa on 15 May. At the end of the season, Amorim was named Primeira Liga's Manager of the Month in April and the Primeira Liga's Manager of the Year.

2021–22: European improvement and runner-up finish 

In his second summer transfer window, Amorim identified the defensive areas which required improvement for the squad, with his options being shorter than Sporting's domestic rivals, leading Ricardo Esgaio to return to the club, midfielder Manuel Ugarte and defender Rúben Vinagre also being signed. After remaining as a back-up to Antonio Adán, Luís Maximiano was sold to Spanish La Liga side Granada, which in turn led to Sporting signing João Virgínia. At the end of the transfer window, starting left-back Nuno Mendes was loaned to Paris Saint-Germain, with Pablo Sarabia moving in the other direction.

Amorim began his second season at Sporting by winning the Supertaça Cândido de Oliveira, on 31 July 2021, in the 2–1 defeat of his former club Braga. After losing their first two Champions League group games, Sporting won their next three matches, culminating on 24 November when they defeated Borussia Dortmund 3–1 at home in the penultimate fixture to ensure the club's qualification to the round of sixteen, for the first time since the 2008–09 season. On 28 November, Amorim became the fastest manager to win 50 games in the Primeira Liga, following a 2–0 home win against Tondela. On 3 December, he led his squad to their first victory at the Estádio da Luz in six years, following a 3–1 away defeat of rivals Benfica in the Derby de Lisboa.

On 29 January 2022, Amorim won his third consecutive league cup final, in a 2–1 victory against Benfica. Sporting were eliminated in the last 16 of the Champions League by Manchester City, 5–0 on aggregate, knocked out of the Taça de Portugal in the semi-finals by Porto, and finished the league season on 85 points as the year before, but six points behind aforementioned rival.

2022–23: European and domestic disappointment 
The following season, Sporting endured a disappointing start to the season, including a 3–3 away draw to Braga and two consecutive losses to Porto (3–0) and Chaves (2–0), with the side being placed 13th in the league table, following the departure of key players João Palhinha and Matheus Nunes to Premier League sides Fulham and Wolverhampton Wanderers, respectively. Referring to the departures of both players, Amorim said "I, as a coach, failed to plan [summer transfer window]. What we have to pay attention to now, in this end of the market, is to be sure where we are going, not to think that we have to save now everything that we changed in a one-year planning". 

Despite their league form, on 7 September, Sporting won in Germany for the first time in their history, beating Europa League champions Eintracht Frankfurt 3–0 in their first group stage match of the 2022–23 UEFA Champions League, followed by surprising victory at home over Tottenham Hotspur in their next fixture. The following group stages matches, were marked by two individual errors from Antonio Adán and Ricardo Esgaio, which saw them lose twice to Marseille 4–1 and 2–0, respectively, with Esgaio coming through to a lot of scrutiny, from the club supporters, which led to Amorim defend him saying "He's not one of the fans' favorite players, but he's one of mine. As long as I am here, I will protect him as much as possible. He will never be abandoned by the manager and as long as I'm here there's nothing you can do to Esgaio". Both losses, were followed by a surprise elimination from the third round of the Taça de Portugal to Liga 3 side Varzim, after a narrow 1–0 loss. After losing 2–1 at home to Eintracht Frankfurt on 1 November, Sporting finished third in the group stage, which put them in the Europa League knockout round play-offs.

Despite a difficult league season, Amorim guided Sporting to their third and Amorim's fourth consecutive league cup final, where they lost 2–0 to Porto in Leiria, who won tournament for the first time. In the Europa League, Amorim led Sporting to the quarter-finals, following a surprise victory over favourites Arsenal on penalties, after drawing 3–3 on aggregate in London.

Style of management

Amorim is known for his communication skills, and tactical knowledge and flexibility. During his tenure with Sporting, Amorim primarily played a 3–4–3, with two midfielders usually João Palhinha and Matheus Nunes, being responsible for protecting the defense, and emphasize the attacking capabilities of the wing-backs Pedro Porro and Nuno Mendes. When defending in a low block, Sporting’s players stay behind the line of the box in order to keep a compact shape, prevent any potential shots from the edge of the box, and limit attacking opportunities. Amorim's team utilizes an intense pressing style and attempts to win the ball back in the final third. 

Amorim's team use interchanging movements to distract the opposing defenders and create space for the attackers to exploit. They focus on exploiting the wings and half-spaces with Pedro Gonçalves playing inside with Pablo Sarabia and Nuno Santos sticking to the left side of the attack. The number 9, usually Paulinho, is the only player who tends to act in terms of pressing the ball and slowing the progression of the opposition, looking to create a space in the defensive line of the opposition that can be quickly attacked, in order to allow the man in possession initially to look for a vertical passing option. Amorim has also a 3–4–3 diamond formation with three mobile defenders; plus one more covering space – becoming, in effect, a defensive midfielder, two "controlling" midfielders with responsibilities to feed the attack-minded players, one second striker, two touchline-hugging wingers and one versatile centre forward.

Personal life
Amorim's cousins, David Simão and Bruno Simão, are also professional footballers.

Career statistics

Club

International

Managerial statistics

Honours

Player
Benfica
Primeira Liga: 2009–10, 2013–14, 2014–15
Taça de Portugal: 2013–14
Taça da Liga: 2008–09, 2009–10, 2010–11, 2013–14, 2014–15
Supertaça Cândido de Oliveira: 2014
UEFA Europa League runner-up: 2013–14

Braga
Taça da Liga: 2012–13

Manager
Braga
Taça da Liga: 2019–20

Sporting
Primeira Liga: 2020–21
Taça da Liga: 2020–21, 2021–22
Supertaça Cândido de Oliveira: 2021
Individual
Primeira Liga's Manager of the Month: February 2021, April 2021, October/November 2021 
Primeira Liga's Manager of the Season: 2021

References

External links

 
 
 National team data 
 
 
 

1985 births
Living people
Footballers from Lisbon
Portuguese footballers
Association football midfielders
Association football utility players
Primeira Liga players
Liga Portugal 2 players
C.F. Os Belenenses players
S.L. Benfica footballers
S.C. Braga players
S.L. Benfica B players
Qatar Stars League players
Al-Wakrah SC players
Portugal youth international footballers
Portugal under-21 international footballers
Portugal B international footballers
Portugal international footballers
2010 FIFA World Cup players
2014 FIFA World Cup players
Portuguese expatriate footballers
Expatriate footballers in Qatar
Portuguese expatriate sportspeople in Qatar
Portuguese football managers
Primeira Liga managers
S.C. Braga managers
Sporting CP managers